Kari Rasmusdatter Hiran (floruit 1716), was a Norwegian farmer and war heroine. She is known for her act during the invasion of Norway by Charles XII of Sweden during the Great Northern War in 1716. She gave the Swedish army false information about the size and plans of the Norwegian army, which evidently caused the Swedish monarch to interrupt his attempt to conquer Norway and return to Sweden. A memorial stone was raised for her in 1956.

See also
 Brita Olsdotter

References
 Tavle 14: Benteplassen», Kulturminneløypa.no
 Norheim, Olav: «Den modige finnekjærringa», Terra Buskerud. Historieboka.no

17th-century births
18th-century deaths
People of the Great Northern War
Women in 18th-century warfare
18th-century Norwegian people
Women in European warfare
18th-century Norwegian women